Vršovice Cemetery (in ) is a cemetery in Vršovice in Prague 10.

Notable burials
The people buried here are amongst others the circus owner Henry Kludský, the composer Bedrich Nicodemus, the writer Rudolf Černý , the painter Zdeněk Glückselig , children's TV presenter Štěpánka Haničincová.

Heritage
As part of the European Heritage Days initiative this cemetery was opened to the public in September 2012.

References

External links
 
 

20th-century establishments in Bohemia
Cemeteries in Prague
Prague 10